Gençay is a Turkish surname. Notable people with the surname include:

Ali Gençay (1905–1957), Turkish footballer
Ramazan Gençay (1961–2018), Turkish-born Canadian economist

See also 
Gencay (given name)

Turkish-language surnames